Aegiphila cordifolia is a species of flowering plant in the family Lamiaceae. It is endemic to Peru, where it occurs in the Amazon rainforest. It is sometimes found in disturbed habitat.

References

cordifolia
Endemic flora of Peru
Least concern plants
Taxonomy articles created by Polbot